Leonard Harris (born December 6, 1977), better known by his stage name GLC, is an American rapper from Chicago, Illinois. He was formerly a member of the Go Getters.

GLC's stage name stands for "Gangsta Legendary Crisis".

GLC was featured in "Spaceship" from Kanye West's album The College Dropout (2004), as well as "Drive Slow" from Late Registration (2005). In 2010, GLC released his debut solo studio album, Love, Life & Loyalty.

Discography

Studio albums 
 Love, Life & Loyalty (2010)

Singles 
 "Gone" (2014)
 "Malcolm X" (2014)
 "Coolout" (2016)
 "The Flow" (2017)

Guest appearances

References

External links 
 
 
 Fake Shore Drive Interview

African-American male rappers
Rappers from Chicago
Living people
1975 births
21st-century American rappers
21st-century American male musicians
21st-century African-American musicians
20th-century African-American people